Park International School and College in Dhaka, Bangladesh started in the year of 2009.

The school follows the English National Curriculum and the English Medium British Curriculum from Cambridge University.

References

Schools in Dhaka District
Cambridge schools in Bangladesh
Educational institutions established in 2009
2009 establishments in Bangladesh